Orhan Birgit (13 July 1927 – 15 October 2019) was a Turkish lawyer, politician and journalist. He was a member of the Republican People's Party and served as the minister of tourism in the first cabinet of Bülent Ecevit in 1974. He was one of the deputies of the party. He contributed to the leading newspapers, including Ulus and Cumhuriyet.

Early life and education
Birgit was born in Kars on 13 July 1927. His father was a civil servant. He received a degree in law from Istanbul University.

Career and activities
Following his graduation he worked as a lawyer and a journalist. His first journalist work was for a local newspaper entitled Akın based in Mersin. In 1946 he joined the Republican People's Party. He was one of the contributors of Ulus, Memleket and Yeni Sabah. Birgit was a member of executive board of the Association of Turkish Cyprus (Turkish: Kıbrıs Türktür Cemiyeti (KTC)) which had been established in August 1954 to support the rights of the Turkish minority in Cyprus against the United Nations and other organisations. He was arrested during the Istanbul pogrom on 7 September 1955 due to his KTC membership  and was acquitted on all counts. In 1958 he established a weekly news magazine, Kim, with Şahap Balcıoğlu, Ali İhsan Göğüş and Özcan Ergüder.

In 1965 Birgit was elected as a deputy from the Republican People's Party. Next year Bülent Ecevit was elected as the secretary general of the Republican People's Party, and Birgit was elected as a member of the central committee of the party in the congress. In the first cabinet of Prime Minister Bülent Ecevit Birgit was named as the minister of tourism and the speaker of the cabinet and served in the post between January and November 1974. Following the military coup in 1980 Birgit worked as a journalist for Dünya and Hürriyet. In 1991 he was again elected to the Parliament from Istanbul for the Democratic Left Party led by Bülent Ecevit. He also taught at faculty of communications of several universities, including Galatasaray University, Istanbul University and Anadolu University. 

Then Birgit joined the Cumhuriyet newspaper. He was author of the following books: Herşey çok güzel olacak (Turkish: Everything will be great), Kalbur saman içinde (Turkish: Griddle in straw) and Evvel zaman içinde (Turkish: Once upon a time). Birgit also directed a documentary entitled Ermenek – Çamlıbel kültür çadırları (Turkish: Ermenek – Çamlıbel culture tents) with  Behlül Dal.

Personal life and death
Birgit was married and had a daughter. He died in Istanbul on 15 October 2019. He was buried in Edirnekapı Sakızağacı cemetery in Istanbul on 17 October.

References

20th-century Turkish lawyers
20th-century Turkish journalists
1927 births
2019 deaths
People from Kars
Istanbul University Faculty of Law alumni
Members of the 15th Parliament of Turkey
Republican People's Party (Turkey) politicians
Members of the 13th Parliament of Turkey
Members of the 16th Parliament of Turkey
Democratic Left Party (Turkey) politicians
Ulus (newspaper) people
Cumhuriyet people
Hürriyet people
Turkish non-fiction writers
Ministers of Tourism of Turkey
21st-century Turkish journalists
Documentary film directors
Turkish magazine founders